The redhook myleus, Myloplus rubripinnis, is a medium to large omnivorous fish of the family Serrasalmidae from South America, where found in the Amazon and Orinoco basins, as well as rivers of the Guiana Shield. They are also called the redhook silver dollar and are one of the fish referred to as "silver dollars". These fish are capable of delivering serious bites to humans.

References 
 

Serrasalmidae
Freshwater fish of Brazil
Freshwater fish of Colombia
Freshwater fish of Ecuador
Freshwater fish of Peru
Fish of the Amazon basin
Taxa named by Johannes Peter Müller
Taxa named by Franz Hermann Troschel
Fish described in 1844